The Winquist and Hansen classification is a system of categorizing femoral shaft fractures based upon the degree of comminution.

Classification

References

Bone fractures
Orthopedic classifications
Injuries of hip and thigh